Fethi Benslama (born 1951) is a French psychoanalyst of Tunisian origin. He is a Professor of Psychopathology at Paris Diderot University, and the author of several books about political Islam.

Early life
Fethi Benslama was born on July 31, 1951 in Salakta, Tunisia.

Career
Benslama is a psychoanalyst.  He is a Professor of Psychopathology at Paris Diderot University, and a member of the Tunisian Academy of Sciences, Letters, and Arts. He has authored several books about political Islam, including one about the Arab Spring. He has argued that radical Islam shares elements with religious cults, but he adds that it is partly based on a shared "Islamic identity myth" born out of the reality of war. He has also argued that terrorists kill for the sake of "jouissance," not to act upon suicidal ideation.

Benslama is the co-founder of a deradicalization center for French youths who return to France after visiting Syria. In the wake of the 2016 Nice truck attack, he called for the press to stop publishing the pictures and names of terrorists to avoid their "glorification".

Works

References

External links
Faculty webpage

Living people
People from Mahdia Governorate
Tunisian expatriates in France
Tunisian psychoanalysts
Tunisian scholars of Islam
Academic staff of the University of Paris
Counterterrorism theorists
1951 births
Members of the Tunisian Academy of Sciences, Letters, and Arts